This is a listing of commandants superior of the French Strategic Base of Bizerte, in Tunisia.

Brief timeline
3 May 1881: Conquest of Tunisia, France takes possession of Bizerte.
20 March 1956: Independence of Tunisia, France retains Bizerte (Strategic Base of Bizerte).
5 September 1961: France recognizes Tunisian sovereignty over Bizerte and agrees withdraw upon cessation of hostilities in Algeria.
15 October 1963: France evacuates Bizerte.

List of commandants superior
Joseph Elisée Auguste Laurin (1954–1958)
Marc Antoine (1958 – October 1960)
Maurice Amman (3 October 1960 – 1961)
Robert Henri Auguste Meynier (1961–1963)
Gustave Raoul Vivier (16 April 1963 – 15 October 1963)

See also
Bizerte crisis

Sources

French
Tunisia history-related lists

Strategic Base of Bizerte Commandants Superior